Maximo Tolonen (born 4 March 2001) is a Finnish professional footballer who plays as a striker for IF Gnistan.

Career
Tolonen was born to a Finnish father and an Argentine mother. He grew up in Espoo, but moved to Cambridge in England when he was five years old. They lived for one-and-a-half years in Cambridge before moving back to Espoo. Tolonen is fluent in Finnish, Spanish because his mother is Argentine, and English because he lived in England and Scotland.

At the age of 10, in 2011, Tolonen moved to Scotland with his family. He began playing for Rangers. The club later offered him a contract, but he declined, because it was to far away from where he lived in Edinburgh. He then moved to Hibernian. Two years later, the Tolonen family moved back to Finland and joined FC Honka.

He left SJK at the end of the 2019 season. On 3 December 2019, it was confirmed that Tolonen would join IFK Mariehamn for the 2020 season, signing a one-year deal with an option for one further year.

References

2001 births
Living people
Finnish footballers
Finnish expatriate footballers
Finnish people of Argentine descent
Rangers F.C. players
Hibernian F.C. players
FC Honka players
Seinäjoen Jalkapallokerho players
SJK Akatemia players
IFK Mariehamn players
IF Gnistan players
Veikkausliiga players
Ykkönen players
Kakkonen players
Association football forwards
Finnish expatriate sportspeople in Scotland
Expatriate footballers in Scotland
Footballers from Espoo